Naseem Hamed vs. Kevin Kelley was a professional boxing match contested on December 19, 1997 for the WBO featherweight championship.

Background
After defeating Jose Badillo in October 1997, it was announced that British sensation Naseem Hamed would make his long-awaited American debut just two months later to take former WBC featherweight champion Kevin Kelley. Hamed at the time was undefeated as a professional, sporting a 28–0 record and had become well regarded for his knockout power, with all but two of his fights having been won by way of knockout. Due to both his fighting style and flamboyant personality, Hamed had also quickly become one boxing's most popular fighters and had become the highest paid featherweight in the sport earning over $12 million in purses and endorsements the year prior and HBO, who was to air the bout on its World Championship Boxing program, had both signed Hamed to an exclusive six fight, $12 million contract to air his fights and spent $1 million on a publicity campaign to promote Hamed prior to his fight with Kelley. Kelley had lost the WBC featherweight title in early 1995 but had gone undefeated in 8 fights since and had picked up the less-regarded WBU version of the title in February 1996. Hamed angered Kelley, a New York native, with his trash-talk, claiming "I could have brought Kevin Kelley to my own backyard and beat him up there. But I didn't want to do that. I wanted to come to his own backyard and bring him down in front of his own crowd." Kelley responded "The first round I'm going straight for that mouth, I've been saving up everything for the bell."

Hamed, who was also known for his flashy ring entrances in his native England, made a lengthy entrance for his US debut where he danced behind a screen to Will Smith's "Men in Black" before entering the arena to Red Rat's "Shelly Ann" on a fashion runway while confetti rained down from the ceiling before finally entering the ring with his trademark flip over the ropes.

The fight
The fight would become an action packed slugfest as each fighter would score three knockdowns over one another. Hamed started the fight strongly landing more punches as Kelley struggled with Hamed's unorthodox fighting style. With a minute left in the round Hamed had backed Kelley into one of the corners, however Kelley was able to catch Hamed with a leaping right hook as Hamed stepped back to send him to mat for the fight's first knockdown. Hamed was quickly able to get back to his feet and escaped the round without any further damage. Kelley began round 2 as the aggressor and scored a second knockdown over Hamed after landing a left hook that dazed Hamad and made both gloves touch the canvas as Hamed attempted to hold himself up from going down. After Hamed took a standing 8 count, Kelley swarmed him in hopes of landing another knockdown and began swinging wildly as Hamed attempted to dodge his punches and side-stepped Kelley, causing Kelley to miss completely and fall to the canvas, though the referee ruled it a slip. Kelley would continue to chase the champion before Hamed countered with a straight right hand that sent Kelly down for Hamed's first knockdown of the fight. Kelly would also answer the standing 8 count and both fighters made it out of the round. After both fighters took a more cautious approach in round 3, the action would resume in the fourth round. About a minute and a half into the round Hamed landed two left hooks that sent Kelley down for the second time. Kelley again was able to continue, but Hamed continued to throw power punches at Kelley, but after Kelley countered with a right hook, Hamed's right glove again touched the canvas, officially giving Kelley his third knockdown of Hamed. After the fight resumed following the standing 8 count, Kelley looked to regain his momentum as he drove Hamed back, but Hamed would land a hard left that send Kelley down for the third time. Kelley was able to get back to his knees but was clearly hurt and could not get back to his feet as the referee reached the count of 10, giving Hamed the knockout victory at 2:27 of the fourth round.

Fight card

Fight purses
Guaranteed fight purses:

Naseem Hamed ($2,000,000) vs. Kevin Kelley ($500,000)

Viewership
In the United States, the fight was watched by  viewers on HBO. It generated a 10.1 Nielsen rating among HBO's 25million subscribers, significantly higher than HBO's 8.5 average boxing rating. In the United Kingdom, the fight was broadcast pay-per-view on Sky Box Office.

References

1997 in boxing
1997 in sports in New York City
1990s in Manhattan
Boxing matches at Madison Square Garden
December 1997 sports events in the United States